Dabolt is an unincorporated community in Jackson County, Kentucky, United States.

A post office was established in the community in 1928. Dabolt was named for Frederick P. Dabolt, a head of Foley Lumber Co.

References

Unincorporated communities in Jackson County, Kentucky
Unincorporated communities in Kentucky